Utku Şen (born 15 June 1998) is a German footballer who plays as a forward for Turkish club Vanspor on loan from Adanaspor.

Personal life
Şen was born in Germany, and is of Turkish descent through his parents.

References

External links
 

1998 births
Living people
People from Flensburg
German footballers
German people of Turkish descent
Association football forwards
Holstein Kiel players
Lüneburger SK Hansa players
VfL Osnabrück players
2. Bundesliga players
3. Liga players
Footballers from Schleswig-Holstein